Packrat Peak, at  above sea level is a peak in the Sawtooth Range of Idaho. The peak is located in the Sawtooth Wilderness of Sawtooth National Recreation Area on the border of Boise and Custer counties. Warbonnet and Little Warbonnet lakes are in the basin north of the peak.

See also

 What's a Packrat?
 List of peaks of the Sawtooth Range (Idaho)
 List of mountains of Idaho
 List of mountain peaks of Idaho
 List of mountain ranges in Idaho

References 

Mountains of Custer County, Idaho
Mountains of Idaho
Sawtooth Wilderness